Dinesh Goswami was an Indian politician. He was the Law and Justice Minister under the V.P.Singh government in 1989. He was elected to the Lok Sabha, lower house of the Parliament of India from the Gauhati constituency in 1985.He was also a member of the Rajya Sabha from Assam.

He was killed in a car accident on 2 June 1991, in his home state of Assam.

References

1935 births
1991 deaths
Lok Sabha members from Assam
Rajya Sabha members from Assam
India MPs 1984–1989
Members of the Cabinet of India
V. P. Singh administration
Law Ministers of India
Steel Ministers of India
Mining ministers of India
Asom Gana Parishad politicians